Canyon Ambush is a 1952 American Western film directed by Lewis D. Collins and written by Joseph F. Poland. The film stars Johnny Mack Brown, Lee Roberts, Phyllis Coates, Hugh Prosser, Dennis Moore and Marshall Reed. The film was released on October 12, 1952, by Monogram Pictures.

Plot
Agent Johnny Mack Brown is called to Border City, Wyoming, by the U.S. government and ordered to catch a gang of outlaws led by a mysterious masked man that is murdering ranchers and holding up stagecoach drivers. The female editor of the town newspaper, Marian Gaylord, and the sheriff Bob Conway, start an anti-crime campaign. Agent Brown discovers that some members of the gang actually work in town government, and even discovers the identity of the gang's masked leader.

Cast          
Johnny Mack Brown as Johnny Mack Brown
Lee Roberts as Bob Conway
Phyllis Coates as Marian Gaylord
Hugh Prosser as George Millarde
Dennis Moore as Henry Lockwood
Marshall Reed as Macklin
Denver Pyle as Tom Carlton
Pierce Lyden as John Brackett

References

External links
 

1952 films
1950s English-language films
American Western (genre) films
1952 Western (genre) films
Monogram Pictures films
Films directed by Lewis D. Collins
Films scored by Raoul Kraushaar
American black-and-white films
Films with screenplays by Joseph F. Poland
1950s American films